KAKW-DT (channel 62) is a television station licensed to Killeen, Texas, United States, broadcasting the Spanish-language Univision network to the Austin area. It is owned and operated by TelevisaUnivision alongside low-power, Class A UniMás outlet KTFO-CD (channel 31). Both stations share studios on North Loop Boulevard in Austin, while KAKW-DT's transmitter is located in unincorporated Williamson County (approximately halfway between Austin and Killeen). Although the station is licensed to a community in the Waco market, most of its local programming and advertising is targeted at the Austin market.

History

The station first signed on the air on May 31, 1996 as a primary affiliate of UPN and a secondary affiliate of The WB for the Waco–Killeen–Temple market; the station was originally owned by White Knight Broadcasting, with Communications Corporation of America (ComCorp), owner of Waco-based Fox affiliate KWKT (channel 44) and the station's Bryan-based satellite KYLE-TV (channel 28), providing sales and other services to KAKW under a commercial inventory agreement. KAKW had secured the UPN affiliation in June 1995, prior to going on the air; the WB affiliation had previously been held by KYLE before its 1996 acquisition by ComCorp. Prior to the launch of Fredericksburg-based San Antonio station KBEJ (now KCWX) in 2000, channel 62 doubled as an alternate UPN affiliate for the Austin television market, alongside K13VC (channel 13); the move of KAKW's digital signal from channel 23 to channel 13 would subsequently result in the shutdown of K13VC on March 29, 2003.

In January 2001, KAKW became a primary WB affiliate, though UPN programming was retained on a secondary basis. That October, White Knight agreed to sell KAKW to Univision Communications in a $30 million deal, with the intention of converting it into a Univision station; the sale was opposed by The WB, who filed a lawsuit seeking to block the sale and the concurrent sale of El Paso sister station KKWB to Entravision Communications, as KAKW's contract with The WB was not slated to expire until January 15, 2008. On January 7, 2002, after Univision assumed control of KAKW, it dropped the WB and UPN affiliations and converted it to a Univision owned-and-operated station; it also expanded the station's market coverage to Austin. Univision also invested in creating a news department for KAKW and began producing daily Spanish-language local newscasts. The WB subsequently moved its programming in the Waco/Killeen/Temple market to a secondary clearance on ABC affiliate KXXV (channel 25), while UPN signed a deal with Time Warner Cable to air its programming on a leased access channel that would later be replaced by KBTX-TV's second digital subchannel.

Until 2009, KAKW also operated a repeater in Austin, KAKW-CA (channel 31). That year, the station switched its affiliation to Telefutura, and changed its call letters to KTFO-CD.

News operation
KAKW-DT broadcasts five hours of locally produced newscasts each week, consisting of two half-hour evening newscasts shown at 5:00 and 10:00 p.m. on weekdays. Following its purchase by Univision Communications in 2002, the station invested in the development of a news department for KAKW and began producing daily Spanish language local newscasts each weeknight.

On March 27, 2015, KAKW-DT announced it would launch a regionalized morning newscast, shared with fellow Univision O&Os KXLN-DT in Houston, KUVN-DT in Dallas, and KWEX-DT in San Antonio. The newscast includes local weather and traffic cut-ins, which are also provided during Univision's Despierta America. The regionalized morning newscast uses the Noticias Texas branding.

Technical information

Subchannels
The station's signal is multiplexed:

Analog-to-digital conversion
KAKW shut down its analog signal on June 12, 2009, as part of the FCC-mandated transition to digital television for full-power stations. The station's digital signal remained on its pre-transition VHF channel 13, using PSIP to display KAKW's virtual channel as 62 on digital television receivers, which was among the high-band UHF channels (52-69) that were removed from broadcasting use as a result of the transition.

References

External links 

Univision network affiliates
GetTV affiliates
Ion Mystery affiliates
Dabl affiliates
Television channels and stations established in 1996
AKW-DT
AKW-DT
AKW-DT
1996 establishments in Texas